Cyborg Cop (theatrically released in the Philippines as Universal Warrior 2) is a 1993 American direct-to-video science-fiction action film starring David Bradley, John Rhys-Davies, Todd Jensen, Alonna Shaw, and Rufus Swart as the Cyborg. It was directed by Sam Firstenberg and written by Greg Latter. It is the first installment in the Cyborg Cop film series. The film has two sequels, Cyborg Cop II and Cyborg Cop III, released in 1995 as Terminal Impact.

Plot
Ex-DEA officer Jack Ryan has quit his job following a terrible shoot-out. Jack Ryan receives a message for help from his brother Phillip, who had been employed for a dangerous military mission in the Caribbean. He is unaware that his brother is being used for an unprecedented scientific experiment: Professor Joachim Kessel has developed a technique to turn any soldier into a Cyborg - a half-human, half-robot creature - virtually indestructible. Thanks to his army of Cyborgs, Kessel wants to take over the Caribbean, and Jack will become a kind of "Cop of the Cyborgs" to stop the man.

Cast
 David Bradley as DEA Agent Jack Ryan 
 Todd Jensen as Phillip Ryan 
 John Rhys-Davies as Professor Joachim Kessel
 Alonna Shaw as Cathy
 Ron Smerczak as Callan
 Rufus Swart as Cyborg
 Anthony Fridjon as Hogan
 Shalom Kenan as Steve
 Robert Whitehead as Dr. Stechman
 Steven Leader as Frankie
 Robert Reynolds as Johnson
 Ernest Ndlovu as Sergeant

Release
Cyborg Cop was released direct-to-video in the United States in 1993. In the Philippines, the film was theatrically released by Solar Films as Universal Warrior 2 on May 19, 1995.

Critical reception
Critical reception was generally, although not universally, poor. Halliwell's Film Guide, for example, described it as "dim standard robot action fodder" with a "violent, cliché-ridden plot".

References

1993 films
1990s adventure films
1990s American films
1990s English-language films
1990s science fiction action films
1993 independent films
American adventure films
American exploitation films
American independent films
American science fiction action films
Films directed by Sam Firstenberg
Cyborg Cop films
Cyborg films
Mad scientist films
Nu Image films